ARCADE is a quarterly magazine  about architecture and design in the Northwestern United States. The magazine was established in 1981. It is published by the Northwest Architectural League. The mission of ARCADE is to provide dialogue about design and the built environment. The magazine is based in Seattle, Washington.

See also
 List of architecture magazines

References

External links
 
 AIA Seattle 2005 honor awards

1981 establishments in Washington (state)
Architecture magazines
Magazines established in 1981
Magazines published in Seattle
Quarterly magazines published in the United States